Pearlfish are marine fish in the ray-finned fish family Carapidae. They are slender, elongated fish with no scales, translucent bodies, and dorsal fin rays which are shorter than their anal fin rays. Adults of most species live symbiotically inside various invertebrate hosts, and some live parasitically inside sea cucumbers. The larvae are free living.

Characteristics
Pearlfishes are slender, distinguished by having dorsal fin rays that are shorter than their anal fin rays. They have translucent, scaleless bodies reminiscent of eels. They reproduce by laying oval-shaped eggs, about 1 mm in length.

Ecology

Pearlfishes are unusual in that the adults of most species live inside various types of invertebrates. They typically live inside clams, starfish, or sea squirts, and are simply commensal, not harming their hosts. However, some species are known to be parasitic on sea cucumbers, eating their gonads and living in their anal pores. Pearlfish usually live alone, or in pairs.

Regardless of the habits of the adults, the larvae of pearlfish are free-living among the plankton. Pearlfish larvae can be distinguished by the presence of a long filament in front of their dorsal fins, sometimes with various appendages attached.

Genera
The genera are divided into three major groupings based on their level of symbiosis:
 Echiodon and Snyderidia - free-living
 Carapus and Onuxodon - commensal
 Encheliophis - parasitic, fish in this group live in invertebrate hosts found in shallow-water coral communities such as bivalves, sea cucumbers, and starfish.

References 

 
Parasitic vertebrates